Luigi Rovati (November 24, 1904 in Cinisello Balsamo – March 8, 1989) was an Italian boxer who competed in the 1932 Summer Olympics.

In 1932 he was awarded the silver medal in the heavyweight class after losing the final against Santiago Lovell of Argentina.

1932 Olympic boxing results

Below are the bouts fought by Luigi Rovati of Italy in the heavyweight division of the 1932 Olympic boxing tournament in Los Angeles:

 Quarterfinal: bye
 Semifinal: defeated Frederick Feary (United States) on points
 Final: lost to Santiago Lovell (Argentina) on points (was awarded silver medal)

References
 profile
Fight Record

1904 births
1989 deaths
People from Cinisello Balsamo
Heavyweight boxers
Olympic boxers of Italy
Boxers at the 1932 Summer Olympics
Olympic silver medalists for Italy
Olympic medalists in boxing
Italian male boxers
Medalists at the 1932 Summer Olympics
Sportspeople from the Metropolitan City of Milan